Praveen Prabhakar (born 9 September 1976) is an Indian film editor who works in Malayalam films.

Biography

Early life

He studied at St. Joseph's College, Devagiri and migrated to Chennai in 1997. He graduated from the University of Calicut, started his career editing commercials, documentaries, music videos, short films and trailers in Chennai before moving on to Feature films. Praveen has edited over 500 commercials for many advertising agencies. He has worked alongside some of the most prestigious names in the film world including Rajiv Menon, Anwar Rasheed, Anjali Menon and Amal Neerad.Since then he mastered film editing.

Awards
SICA Award 2014 – Best Editor for Bangalore Days.
Kerala Film Producers Association Award 2014 – Best Editor for Bangalore Days and Iyobinte Pusthakam.
Janmabhumi Film Awards 2018 – Best Editor for Koode.

Filmography

References

https://in.bookmyshow.com/person/praveen-prabhakar/IEIN071365/

External links
 

Film editors from Kerala
1976 births
Living people
Malayalam film editors
Artists from Kozhikode